South Point may mean:

South Point, Lexington, a neighborhood in Lexington, Kentucky, USA
South Point, Ohio, a village in Lawrence County, Ohio, USA
South Point, Texas, a census-designated place in Cameron County, Texas, USA
South Point Hotel, Casino & Spa, in Las Vegas, Nevada, USA
South Point Lighthouse in the Bahamas
South Point (Wilsons Promontory), the southernmost point in mainland Australia, on Wilsons Promontory, Victoria, Australia
South Point School, Kolkata, West Bengal, India
 South Point High School (North Carolina) in Belmont, North Carolina
 South Point High School (Ohio) in South Point, Ohio
Ka Lae, commonly called "South Point", the southern tip of the island of Hawaii, also the most southern point of land in the USA
Southpoint is the name of an Australian shopping center in Sydney's Eastern Suburb of Hillsdale
South Point (shopping mall) in McDonough, Georgia
Southpoint Shopping Centre, in Hillsdale, NSW
South Point (Deception Island), a headland in Deception Island, South Shetland Islands
The Streets at Southpoint, a shopping mall in Durham, North Carolina
Southpoint (Jacksonville), a business center in Jacksonville, Florida